"Pazza idea" (Italian for "Crazy Idea") is an Italian ballad composed by Maurizio Monti and Giovanni Ullu, with lyrics written by Paolo Dossena and Cesare Gigli. It was originally performed by Italian singer Patty Pravo and released as the single from the album of the same name in 1973.

The song reached no. 1 in Italian singles chart and stayed at the top for nine consecutive weeks between August and October 1973. It also charted in Belgium and the Netherlands, becoming Patty's second international hit. "Pazza idea" was the second best-selling single of 1973 in Italy and remains one of the biggest hits of Patty Pravo's career. The singer has recorded the track in English as "Crazy Idea" and in German as "Was für ein Tag". The music video for the song was filmed in Forte dei Marmi and London.

The song was later covered by many artists, including Dutch singer Rita Hovink in 1976, Iva Zanicchi in 1987, and Albano Carrisi in Spanish in 2012.

Track listing
7" single
A. "Pazza idea" (Paolo Dossena, Cesare Gigli, Maurizio Monti, Giovanni Ullu) – 4:44
B. "Morire tra le viole" (Maurizio Monti) – 3:44

7" single (Germany)
A. "Was für ein Tag" – 3:46
B. "Die schwarze Rose" – 2:58

Charts

Weekly charts

Year-end charts

References

1973 singles
1973 songs
Italian songs
Number-one singles in Italy
Patty Pravo songs